Jefferson Bucks Hospital is a non-profit hospital located in Langhorne, Pennsylvania and is a part of Jefferson Health Northeast, a multi-state non-profit health system now a part of Jefferson Health. The hospital serve as a general hospital of Aria-Jefferson Health and has a Level II trauma center. It is the newest addition to the Jefferson Health Northeast system. The hospital offers 24/7 addiction support. The addiction specialist can assisting in helping patients enter an addiction treatment facility.

History
In 1999, the Aria Health system acquired Delaware Valley Medical Center, which is now called Jefferson Bucks Hospital. It is a 112-bed hospital located in Langhorne, Pennsylvania.

Aria Health sought to build a new 229-bed facility in Lower Makefield to replace Bucks County Hospital. Local residents opposed this project, due to concerns about traffic congestion. In 2013, Aria Health proposed news plans for a "health care village," a facility offering multiple health care services, which may have lower impact on the environment and traffic congestion.

In 2019, Jefferson Frankford Hospital was named one of 18 Philadelphia region hospitals that made Healthgrades' top 250 hospitals for 2019. On July 22, 2019, Jefferson Bucks temporarily lost power due to a storm that left over 9000 residents in Bucks County without power. The hospital relied on a backup source until about 22:00 EST.

References

External links
 
 Jefferson Health System

Hospitals in Pennsylvania